Mattel Interactive (Known as Mattel Media until 1999) was a video game publisher and software distributor.

History
Mattel originally founded the company as Mattel Media in February 1996, as an aim to expand into the multimedia unit by producing CD-ROM titles based on Mattel franchises like Hot Wheels, Barbie, Fisher-Price and Polly Pocket. The company's first releases came out in the Fall of 1996, with the company's Barbie Fashion Designer program was the first commercially successful video game made for girls.

With the success of their first wave of products, Mattel Media then set on producing CD-ROM based interactive material for toys such as the Talk with Me! Barbie.

Mattel Media later expanded to Video Games soon after, publishing titles like Hot Wheels Stunt Track Driver.

In the fall of 1998, Mattel agreed to acquire The Learning Company in a stock-for-stock merger valuing the company at approximately $4.2 billion. With the merger, Mattel themselves laid off 3000 employees

Mattel sold both Mattel Interactive and The Learning Company in 2000 at a loss to Gores Technology group. The total financial losses to Mattel have been estimated to be as high as $3.6 billion. Mattel's acquisition of The Learning Company has been referred to as "one of the worst acquisitions of all time" by several prominent business journals.

In February 2001, Mattel signed a publishing and distribution deal with THQ for the Hot Wheels and Matchbox licenses, and Vivendi Universal Interactive Publishing for other major licenses including Diva Starz, Fisher-Price and Barbie. That same month, THQ also acquired Mattel's computer rights to Rugrats, SpongeBob SquarePants and Rocket Power and Mattel's console and computer rights to The Wild Thornberrys and Jimmy Neutron: Boy Genius.

In 2000, the ex-Learning Company and Mattel assets acquired by Gores were split up into three divisions - GAME Studios for Video Games, The Learning Company for Educational Software and Broderbund for Home Software. GAME Studios' was sold to Ubi Soft in March 2001, taking all of the gaming assets formerly held by The Learning Company. The Learning Company itself was acquired by Riverdeep Interactive Learning Limited in September 2001 and later acquired all of Broderbund in August 2002.

List of games
Barbie Fashion Designer (1996)
Magic Fairy Tales: Barbie as Rapunzel (1997)
 Clueless CD-ROM (1997)
Barbie Magic Hair Styler (1997)
Hot Wheels Stunt Track Driver (1998)
Detective Barbie In the Mystery of the Carnival Caper! (1998)
My Interactive Pooh (1998)
Nickelodeon BrainBender (1999)
Barbie Race and Ride (1999)
Barbie Super Sports (1999)
Detective Barbie 2: The Vacation Mystery (1999)
The Adventures of Elmo in Grouchland (1999)
Create and Draw in Elmo's World (1999)
Sesame Street Music Maker (1999)
Generation Girl: Gotta Groove (1999)
Pokémon Project Studio (1999, Branded under The Learning Company in the US, and Mattel Interactive in Europe)
  Uno (1999)
Tyco RC: Assault with a Battery (2000)
Prince of Persia: Arabian Nights (2000)
Rugrats in Paris: The Movie (2000)
Totally Angelica: Boredom Busters! (2000)
Detective Barbie: The Mystery Cruise (2000)
Matchbox Construction Zone (2000)
Rat Attack (2000, published by Mindscape, N64 version distributed by Mattel Interactive in Europe)
Elmo's Deep Sea Adventure (2000)
Barbie: Magic Genie Adventure (2000)
Panzer General III: Scorched Earth (2000)
Sega Rally 2 (2000, Windows version)
Rock 'Em Sock 'Em Robots Arena (2000)
Championship Surfer (2000)
Diva Starz (2000)
The Wild Thornberrys: Rambler (2000)
Max Steel: Covert Missions (2000)

Sources

 
Mattel
Former Mattel subsidiaries
Defunct video game companies of the United States
Video game companies established in 1996
Video game companies disestablished in 2001
Educational software companies
Video game publishers
1996 establishments in the United States
2001 disestablishments in the United States